Regal Shocker is the maker of the paranormal revival of the iconic reality horror-action show of the 1980s, originally offered by Regal Entertainment and aired on GMA Network and then moved to IBC 13. It is a Filipino horror / thriller television series offered by TV5 together with Regal Entertainment and airs every Saturday after Wil Time Bigtime and before The Jose and Wally Show Starring Vic Sotto. It premiered on November 5, 2011 with the episode entitled Elevator led by Gabby Concepcion and Niña Jose.

About Regal Shocker
The Regal Shocker anthology plays with various horror subgenres such as classic monsters, quiet/creepy horror, psychological horror, supernatural, dark fantasy, creatures from lower mythology, horror-action-comedy and so much more.

Armed with the expertise of local writers and directors who have had experience working on the horror-action genre, Regal Shocker employs a roller coaster of scare tactics to ignite fear and pounce on the viewers' emotions with hair-raising, spine-tingling, heart-pounding stories that Filipinos love to watch.

See also
List of programs broadcast by TV5

References

External links
 Official TV5

Philippine anthology television series
2011 Philippine television series debuts
2012 Philippine television series endings
TV5 (Philippine TV network) original programming
Filipino-language television shows